Benjamin Christoffel Gerhardus Venter (born 15 May 1987 in Johannesburg, South Africa) is a South African rugby union player, currently playing with French Pro D2 side Montauban. His regular position is lock or flanker.

Career

Youth

He represented the  side in the 2006 Under-19 Provincial Championship and the  side in the 2007 and 2008 Under-21 Provincial Championships. That  team won the Championships in both 2007 and 2008. Venter played most of his youth rugby on the Wing.

Griquas

He was named in the  senior professional squad for the 2009 Vodacom Cup and 2009 Currie Cup Premier Division competitions, but missed most of that season due to injury. Venter was also named in the  senior professional squad for the 2010 Vodacom Cup and 2010 Currie Cup Premier Division competitions.

Border Bulldogs

Venter joined East London-based side  later in 2010.

He played in sixteen matches during the 2011 Vodacom Cup and 2011 Currie Cup First Division competitions, weighing in with one try in each competition. He had more game time in 2012, making eighteen appearances during the Vodacom Cup and Currie Cup competitions.

In May 2012, he was named in the South African Barbarians (South) squad that faced  during the 2012 England rugby union tour of South Africa,

Boland Cavaliers

At the end of 2012, Venter moved to Wellington-based. Venter featured prominently during the 2013 and 2014 Vodacom Cup and Currie Cup competitions.

Chambéry

Venter moved to France during 2014 to join Fédérale 1 side Chambéry prior to the 2014–2015 season.

Bordeaux Bègles

In January 2015, he joined Bordeaux Bègles in the French Top 14 as a Medical Joker.

Montauban

On 16 April 2015, Venter signed a permanent contract with French Pro D2 club Montauban for three seasons (2015 - 2018), prior to the 2015–2016 season.

Coaching

Venter suffered a career ending injury while playing for Montauban and his career was cut short at the end of 2016. He has since devoted himself to coaching.

References

South African rugby union players
Living people
1987 births
Rugby union players from Johannesburg
Rugby union locks
Rugby union flankers
Boland Cavaliers players
Border Bulldogs players
Griquas (rugby union) players